Girl Stroke Boy is a 1971 British comedy-drama film directed by Bob Kellett and starring Joan Greenwood, Michael Hordern and Clive Francis. It was based on the play Girl Friend by David Percival.

Cast
 Joan Greenwood – Lettice Mason
 Michael Hordern – George Mason
 Clive Francis – Laurie
 Peter Straker – Jo Delaney
 Patricia Routledge – Pamela Hovendon
 Peter Bull – Peter Hovendon
 Rudolph Walker – Mr Delaney
 Diana Hoddinott – Wife / Husband
 Elisabeth Welch – Mrs Delaney

References

External links
Girlfriend (1970) and Girl Stroke Boy (1971) page at Androgyne Online 

1971 films
1971 comedy-drama films
Films directed by Bob Kellett
British comedy-drama films
Films scored by John Scott (composer)
1971 comedy films
1971 drama films
1970s English-language films
1970s British films